Stanley "Dasher" Thomas (9 May 1892 – 2 November 1958) was an Australian rules footballer who played with Geelong in the Victorian Football League (VFL).

Family
The son of Sarah Jane Hull (1876-) — later, having married John Henry Thomas (1870-) in 1896, she became Sarah Jane Thomas — Thomas Stanley Hull (later known as "Stanley Thomas") was born in Tasmania on 9 May 1892.

He was married to Ethel Mary Murnane (-1982).

Football
Thomas first played for Geelong in 1915. He did not play in 1916; however, from 1917 to 1925 he was a regular member of Geelong's defence.

He represented the VFL in a match against a combined Bendigo Football League team on 24 July 1920.

He only played one finals match in his career: the Semi Final against Fitzroy, at the MCG, on September 1923.

His career ended when he was given a 26-game suspension (the remainder of 1925 and all of 1926) for escalating an all-in brawl that involved players and team officials in Geelong's controversial 1 August 1925 match against North Melbourne.

Death
He died in Geelong on 2 November 1958, and was buried at Geelong Eastern Cemetery.

Footnotes

References
 Holmesby, Russell & Main, Jim (2007). The Encyclopedia of AFL Footballers. 7th ed. Melbourne: Bas Publishing.
 Life member: Stan ("Dasher") Thomas, geelongpastplayers.com.au.

External links
 
 
 Stan Thomas: Boyles Football Photos.

1892 births
1958 deaths
Australian rules footballers from Victoria (Australia)
Geelong Football Club players